Squash at the 2015 Pacific Games in Port Moresby, Papua New Guinea was held on July 6–17, 2015.

Medal summary

Medal table

Medalists

Men's

Women's

Mixed

References

2015 Pacific Games
2015
Pacific Games